"Honey, This Mirror Isn't Big Enough for the Two of Us" is the second single released by American rock band My Chemical Romance  from their debut album, I Brought You My Bullets, You Brought Me Your Love (and second overall single). It is the second track on the album. The song peaked at number 182 in the UK.

The song deals with drug use, reflecting on vocalist Gerard Way's past problems with alcohol.

Track listing

Music video

The music video was first shown at the record release party of I Brought You My Bullets, You Brought Me Your Love in 2002, and was available online. It was not widely released until September 23, 2005 on the 2005 re-release of I Brought You My Bullets, You Brought Me Your Love. Scenes featuring the band performing were directed by Marc Debiak for the production company Grey Sky Films. The interspersed scenes containing a storyline similar to the Takashi Miike film Audition were directed by John Armson. It is about a man looking for a spouse and after a series of interviews, he finds a woman. After their first date he tries to find where she lives and apparently cannot find her address. When he returns to his home, he pours himself a drink and after drinking he collapses on the floor. The woman comes out of a doorway. She then proceeds to torture the paralyzed man, putting needles in his chest and below his eye and chopping off his leg.

Charts

Release history

References

2003 singles
My Chemical Romance songs
Songs about drugs
Songs about alcohol
Songs written by Gerard Way
2002 songs
Metalcore songs